Imola Horváth (born 2 August 2002) is a Hungarian ice hockey player and member of the Hungarian national ice hockey team, currently playing in the Swedish Women's Hockey League (SDHL) with Göteborg HC.

She represented Hungary at the 2021 IIHF Women's World Championship.

Career statistics

International

References

External links
 

2002 births
Living people
Göteborg HC players
Hungarian women's ice hockey forwards
Sportspeople from Székesfehérvár
21st-century Hungarian women